Olla v-nigrum is a species in the family Coccinellidae ("lady beetles"), in the suborder Polyphaga. The species is known generally as the ashy gray lady beetle. The distribution range of Olla v-nigrum includes Central America, North America, and Oceania. It is usually gray or pale tan with small black spots on its elytra and thorax. However, a variation can resemble Chilocorus orbus. This form is black with two red spots on the wing covers and has white on the edge of the prothorax.

References

Further reading
 "The Coccinellidae (Coleoptera) of America North of Mexico", Robert D. Gordon. 1985. Journal of the New York Entomological Society, Vol. 93, No. 1.
 Arnett, R.H. Jr., M. C. Thomas, P. E. Skelley and J. H. Frank. (eds.). (2002). American Beetles, Volume II: Polyphaga: Scarabaeoidea through Curculionoidea. CRC Press LLC, Boca Raton, FL.
 Arnett, Ross H. (2000). American Insects: A Handbook of the Insects of America North of Mexico. CRC Press.
 Belicek, Joseph (1976). "Coccinellidae of western Canada and Alaska with analyses of the transmontane zoogeographic relationships between the fauna of British Columbia and Alberta (Insecta: Coleoptera: Coccinellidae)". Quaestiones Entomologicae, vol. 12, no. 4, 283–409.
 Gordon, Robert D. (1985). "The Coccinellidae (Coleoptera) of America North of Mexico". Journal of the New York Entomological Society, vol. 93, no. 1, 1–912.
 Richard E. White. (1983). Peterson Field Guides: Beetles. Houghton Mifflin Company.

External links
NCBI Taxonomy Browser, Olla v-nigrum

Coccinellidae
Beetles described in 1866